Operation Gambit was a part of Operation Neptune, the landing phase of the invasion of northern France (Operation Overlord) during the Second World War. Gambit involved two X class submarines (British midget submarines) marking the ends of the Anglo-Canadian invasion beaches. Using navigation lights and flags, the submarines indicated the western and eastern limits of Sword and Juno Beaches. X20 and X23 arrived in position on 4 June and due to the delay caused by bad weather, remained in position until  on 6 June (D-Day) when they surfaced, erected the navigational aids, an  telescopic mast with a light shining to seaward, a radio beacon and echo sounder, tapping out a message for the minelayers approaching Sword and Juno.

A similar operation had been offered to the US landing forces to mark their beaches but this was declined. The team of Captain Logan Scott-Bowden and Sergeant Bruce Ogden-Smith did investigate Omaha Beach for General Omar Bradley, returning with a sand sample. The submarines were at some risk of damage due to friendly fire and to avoid this, Lieutenant George Honour the captain of X23 flew a White Ensign of the size more normally used by capital ships.

See also
 Operation Maple
 Operation Postage Able

Footnotes

References

 
 

Operation Neptune
Naval battles and operations of World War II involving the United Kingdom